OGL may refer to:

 Eugene F. Correira International Airport (IATA code: OGL), a Guyanese airport on the Atlantic coast
 Open Game License, a public copyright license by Wizards of the Coast
 Open General Licence, a license issued as part of export control in the United Kingdom
 Open Government Licence, a copyright licence for Crown copyright works published by the UK government